Vegetation is an assemblage of plant species and the ground cover they provide.  It is a general term, without specific reference to particular taxa, life forms, structure, spatial extent, or any other specific botanical or geographic characteristics. It is broader than the term flora which refers to species composition. Perhaps the closest synonym is plant community, but vegetation can, and often does, refer to a wider range of spatial scales than that term does, including scales as large as the global. Primeval redwood forests, coastal mangrove stands, sphagnum bogs, desert soil crusts, roadside weed patches, wheat fields, cultivated gardens and lawns; all are encompassed by the term vegetation.

The vegetation type is defined by characteristic dominant species, or a common aspect of the assemblage, such as an elevation range or environmental commonality. The contemporary use of vegetation approximates that of ecologist Frederic Clements' term earth cover, an expression still used by the Bureau of Land Management.

History of definition
The distinction between vegetation (the general appearance of a community) and flora (the taxonomic composition of a community) was first made by Jules Thurmann (1849). Prior to this, the two terms (vegetation and flora) were used indiscriminately, and still are in some contexts. Augustin de Candolle (1820) also made a similar distinction but he used the terms "station" (habitat type) and "habitation" (botanical region). Later, the concept of vegetation would influence the usage of the term biome with the inclusion of the animal element.

Other concepts similar to vegetation are "physiognomy of vegetation" (Humboldt, 1805, 1807) and "formation" (Grisebach, 1838, derived from "Vegetationsform", Martius, 1824).

Departing from Linnean taxonomy, Humboldt established a new science, dividing plant geography between taxonomists who studied plants as taxa and geographers who studied plants as vegetation. The physiognomic approach in the study of vegetation is common among biogeographers working on vegetation on a world scale, or when there is a lack of taxonomic knowledge of someplace (e.g., in the tropics, where biodiversity is commonly high).

The concept of "vegetation type" is more ambiguous. The definition of a specific vegetation type may include not only physiognomy but also floristic and habitat aspects. Furthermore, the phytosociological approach in the study of vegetation relies upon a fundamental unit, the plant association, which is defined upon flora.

An influential, clear and simple classification scheme for types of vegetation was produced by Wagner & von Sydow (1888). Other important works with a physiognomic approach includes Grisebach (1872), Warming (1895, 1909), Schimper (1898), Tansley and Chipp (1926), Rübel (1930), Burtt Davy (1938), Beard (1944, 1955), André Aubréville (1956, 1957), Trochain (1955, 1957), Küchler (1967), Ellenberg and Mueller-Dombois (1967) (see vegetation classification).

Classifications

There are many approaches for the classification of vegetation (physiognomy, flora, ecology, etc.). Much of the work on vegetation classification comes from European and North American ecologists, and they have fundamentally different approaches. In North America, vegetation types are based on a combination of the following criteria: climate pattern, plant habit, phenology and/or growth form, and dominant species. In the current US standard (adopted by the Federal Geographic Data Committee (FGDC), and originally developed by UNESCO and The Nature Conservancy), the classification is hierarchical and incorporates the non-floristic criteria into the upper (most general) five levels and limited floristic criteria only into the lower (most specific) two levels. In Europe, classification often relies much more heavily, sometimes entirely, on floristic (species) composition alone, without explicit reference to climate, phenology or growth forms. It often emphasizes indicator or diagnostic species which may distinguish one classification from another.

In the FGDC standard, the hierarchy levels, from most general to most specific, are: system, class, subclass, group, formation, alliance, and association. The lowest level, or association, is thus the most precisely defined, and incorporates the names of the dominant one to three (usually two) species of a type. An example of a vegetation type defined at the level of class might be "Forest, canopy cover > 60%"; at the level of a formation as "Winter-rain, broad-leaved, evergreen, sclerophyllous, closed-canopy forest"; at the level of alliance as "Arbutus menziesii forest"; and at the level of association as "Arbutus menziesii-Lithocarpus dense flora forest", referring to Pacific madrone-tanoak forests which occur in California and Oregon, USA. In practice, the levels of the alliance and/or an association are the most often used, particularly in vegetation mapping, just as the Latin binomial is most often used in discussing particular species in taxonomy and in general communication.

Dynamics
Like all the biological systems, plant communities are temporally and spatially dynamic; they change at all possible scales. Dynamism in vegetation is defined primarily as changes in species composition and/or vegetation structure.

Temporal dynamics

Temporally, a large number of processes or events can cause change, but for sake of simplicity, they can be categorized roughly as either abrupt or gradual. Abrupt changes are generally referred to as disturbances; these include things like wildfires, high winds, landslides, floods, avalanches and the like. Their causes are usually external (exogenous) to the community—they are natural processes occurring (mostly) independently of the natural processes of the community (such as germination, growth, death, etc.). Such events can change vegetation structure and composition very quickly and for long time periods, and they can do so over large areas. Very few ecosystems are without some type of disturbance as a regular and recurring part of the long term system dynamic. Fire and wind disturbances are particularly common throughout many vegetation types worldwide. Fire is particularly potent because of its ability to destroy not only living plants, but also the seeds, spores, and living meristems representing the potential next generation, and because of fire's impact on fauna populations, soil characteristics and other ecosystem elements and processes (for further discussion of this topic see fire ecology).

Temporal change at a slower pace is ubiquitous; it comprises the field of ecological succession. Succession is the relatively gradual change in structure and taxonomic composition that arises as the vegetation itself modifies various environmental variables over time, including light, water and nutrient levels. These modifications change the suite of species most adapted to grow, survive and reproduce in an area, causing floristic changes. These floristic changes contribute to structural changes that are inherent in plant growth even in the absence of species changes (especially where plants have a large maximum size, i.e. trees), causing slow and broadly predictable changes in the vegetation. Succession can be interrupted at any time by disturbance, setting the system either back to a previous state, or off on another trajectory altogether. Because of this, successional processes may or may not lead to some static, final state. Moreover, accurately predicting the characteristics of such a state, even if it does arise, is not always possible. In short, vegetative communities are subject to many variables that together set limits on the predictability of future conditions.

Spatial dynamics
As a general rule, the larger an area under consideration, the more likely the vegetation will be heterogeneous across it. Two main factors are at work. First, the temporal dynamics of disturbance and succession are increasingly unlikely to be in synchrony across any area as the size of that area increases. That is, different areas will be at different developmental stages due to different local histories, particularly their times since last major disturbance. This fact interacts with inherent environmental variability (e.g. in soils, climate, topography, etc.), which is also a function of area. Environmental variability constrains the suite of species that can occupy a given area, and the two factors together interact to create a mosaic of vegetation conditions across the landscape. Only in agricultural or horticultural systems does vegetation ever approach perfect uniformity. In natural systems, there is always heterogeneity, although its scale and intensity will vary widely..

See also
 Biocoenosis
 Biome
 Ecological succession
 Ecoregion
 Ecosystem
 Plant cover
 Tropical vegetation
 Vegetation and slope stability

References

Further reading
 Archibold, O. W. Ecology of World Vegetation. New York: Springer Publishing, 1994.
 Barbour, M. G. and W. D. Billings (editors). North American Terrestrial Vegetation. Cambridge: Cambridge University Press, 1999.
 Barbour, M.G, J.H. Burk, and W.D. Pitts. "Terrestrial Plant Ecology". Menlo Park: Benjamin Cummings, 1987.
 Box, E. O. 1981. Macroclimate and Plant Forms: An Introduction to Predictive Modeling in Phytogeography. Tasks for Vegetation Science, vol. 1. The Hague: Dr. W. Junk BV. 258 pp., Macroclimate and Plant Forms: An Introduction to Predictive Modeling in Phytogeography.
 Breckle, S-W. Walter's Vegetation of the Earth. New York: Springer Publishing, 2002.
 Burrows, C. J. Processes of Vegetation Change. Oxford: Routledge Press, 1990.
 Ellenberg, H. 1988. Vegetation ecology of central Europe. Cambridge University Press, Cambridge, Vegetation Ecology of Central Europe.
 Feldmeyer-Christie, E., N. E. Zimmerman, and S. Ghosh. Modern Approaches In Vegetation Monitoring. Budapest: Akademiai Kiado, 2005.
 Gleason, H.A. 1926. The individualistic concept of the plant association. Bulletin of the Torrey Botanical Club, 53:1-20.
 Grime, J.P. 1987. Plant strategies and vegetation processes. Wiley Interscience, New York NY.
 Kabat, P., et al. (editors). Vegetation, Water, Humans and the Climate: A New Perspective on an Interactive System. Heidelberg: Springer-Verlag 2004.
 MacArthur, R.H. and E. O. Wilson. The theory of Island Biogeography. Princeton: Princeton University Press. 1967
 Mueller-Dombois, D., and H. Ellenberg. Aims and Methods of Vegetation Ecology. New York: John Wiley & Sons, 1974. The Blackburn Press, 2003 (reprint).
 UNESCO. 1973. International Classification and Mapping of Vegetation. Series 6, Ecology and Conservation, Paris, .
 Van der Maarel, E. Vegetation Ecology. Oxford: Blackwell Publishers, 2004.
 Vankat, J. L. The Natural Vegetation of North America. Krieger Publishing Co., 1992.

External links

Classification
 Terrestrial Vegetation of the United States Volume I – The National Vegetation Classification System: Development, Status, and Applications  (PDF)
 Federal Geographic Data Committee Vegetation Subcommittee
 Vegetation Classification Standard [FGDC-STD-005, June 1997] (PDF)
 Classifying Vegetation Condition: Vegetation Assets States and Transitions (VAST)

Mapping-related
 Interactive world vegetation map by Howstuffworks
 USGS - NPS Vegetation Mapping Program
 Checklist of Online Vegetation and Plant Distribution Maps
 VEGETATION image processing and archiving centre at VITO
 Spot-VEGETATION programme web page

Climate diagrams

 Climate Diagrams Explained 
 ClimateDiagrams.com Provides climate diagrams for more than 3000 weather stations and for different climate periods from all over the world. Users can also create their own diagrams with their own data.
 WBCS Worldwide Climate Diagrams

Ecological succession
Habitat
Botanical terminology
Plant ecology
Articles containing video clips